is an underground metro station on the Nagoya Municipal Subway in Shōwa-ku, Nagoya, Aichi Prefecture, Japan, operated by the Transportation Bureau City of Nagoya. The station is located in part of the district of Yagoto.

Lines
Yagoto Station is served by the following Nagoya Municipal Subway lines:
 (Station number: T15)
 (Station number: M20)

It is an interchange station between the Tsurumai Line and the Meijō Line, and is located 15.0 kilometers from the terminus of the Tsurumai Line at Kami-Otai Station, and 17.2 kilometers from the terminus of the Meijō Line at Kanayama Station.

Layout
Yagoto Station has one underground island platform for use by the Tsurumai Line and two underground opposed side platforms for use by the Meijō Line.

Platforms

History
Yagoto Station was opened on 18 March 1977 as the initial terminal station for the Tsurumai Line. The Tsurumai Line was extended to Akaike Station on 1 October 1978. The Meijō Line connected to this station from 6 October 2004.

Notable Locations  
Locations nearby include the Shingon Buddhist temple of Kōshō-ji, the Nagoya campus of Chukyo University, and the Yagoto branch of AEON Mall.

References

External links

 Yagoto Station official web site 

Railway stations in Aichi Prefecture
Railway stations in Japan opened in 1977
Yagoto